The Yorkshire Gliding Club (YGC) operate from an airfield on Sutton Bank in the North York Moors National Park, England. The club formed in 1934 from an amalgamation of gliding concerns from the West Riding of Yorkshire and has been in existence for over 80 years and has had many famous fliers such as Nicholas Goodhart, Amy Johnson and Fred Slingsby.

The club's location, on top of Roulston Scar and Sutton Bank over the White Horse of Kilburn, and the sheer drop away of the cliff, has made it a notable aircraft launching point. It is the most popular gliding club in the north of England.

History
Sutton Bank had been in use as a glider launching site for 25 years before the YGC was formed and had also been used by Slingsby Sailplanes to test their aircraft. The first official recorded use of the site was in 1911 when Erik Addyman launched his self-built glider off the edge of Sutton Bank. The Yorkshire Gliding Club was formed in April 1934 as an amalgamation of the Bradford Gliding Club with the Ilkley and District Gliding Club by Phil Wills, Fred Slingsby and Norman Sharpe. The club moved to Sutton Bank in the second half of 1934 when they negotiated a lease on the site from the land owners (it was owned by the Church of England) with the site being perceived as second only to one at Dunstable in the development of British gliding.

Due to the topography of the site, which has a steep west facing escarpment, air is forced upwards against the cliff face providing natural lift with an aerial tow or winch assisting the gliders in getting airborne.

In August 1935, despite being only just over one year old, the Yorkshire Gliding Club and their airfield at Sutton Bank were deemed to be the premier location for the August to September National Gliding Competition. The editorial of the August edition of the Sailplane and Gliding Journal stated  The launch site at Sutton Bank was recognised nationally as the best place in the United Kingdom for high-efficiency soaring and gliding. Hangars and ancillary buildings were erected in 1934 for the National Gliding Championships. In 1936, a brick hangar was built which is still extant today.

During the early days of gliding, men would haul ropes and "run like hell" to catapult the glider into the air, which used the natural up-draughts from the edge of the cliffs to keep the gliders aloft. A mechanical system was installed when the YGC bought a Rolls-Royce Silver Ghost and converted the engine to work a winch to get the gliders airborne. This involved removing the wheels, installing  of steel cable and engaging the drive function to get the aircraft off the ground. When the glider was safely airborne, the gear on the car would be changed to neutral and the aircraft released. Due to the relative simple design of the gliders that YGC used at that time, the grassed areas were sufficient as they were and needed relatively low maintenance. Rabbits were introduced to keep the grass trim but they also supplied rabbit meat to local butchers, a lucrative sideline for the club.

Glider training for Royal Air Force cadets was undertaken at the site during 1939, with No. 28 Glider School using the site sporadically up until their disbandment in 1950. The airstrip was not used for any flying purposes during the Second World War, but may have been left as a decoy airfield to attract enemy bombers (though certain groups such as English Heritage state there is no evidence of this). This was furnished with replica Whitley bombers and became a relief landing ground for RAF Dishforth. At least one Royal Air Force aircraft is recorded to have landed at Sutton Bank when all other airstrips in the Vale of York were fogbound. As the site was familiar to many German glider pilots, defensive ditches were dug out of the airfield by the British Army during the 1940s, as it was perceived as a Nazi invasion site. The Germans were world leaders in the sport of gliding and many had travelled to Britain to train British pilots during the 1930s. One had even spent two years at Sutton Bank in the late 1930s training other glider pilots. As the German use of parachutists and gliders was seen to good effect when they invaded the Low Countries, Sutton Bank was perceived as a risk and so plans were made to fortify the area and cover over the White Horse to prevent identifying the location from the air. The digging damaged the Iron Age fortifications.

In 1959, the circular clubhouse was built; this is still used today as the YGCs cafe and main meeting point; due to its circular nature, it offers panoramic views across the surrounding countryside. A new hangar was built in 2014 to accommodate the increase in members and storage of aircraft.

The grassed strip is also available for powered aircraft such as small propeller driven planes which tow the gliders into the air, and other types such as gyrocopters. The YGC is open seven days a week and deploys aircraft each day weather permitting, but they also have an on-site simulator, which can be used in the event of a non-flying day. The simulator cost £17,000 and was installed in 2008. Since 2011, the YGC and the training element from RAF Linton-on-Ouse have had cross-training days to make the two entities aware of each other in the sky. As both the YGC and the RAF pilots under training use the crowded airspace of the Vale of York, a programme was developed where all pilots going through Basic Flying Training (BFT) with the RAF are given hands-on experience with gliders.

In September 2021, the YGC had 13 aircraft registered on the UK Register of Civil Aircraft and in 2013 had a complement of just under 200 members; it is often described as being the most popular gliding club in the north of England. The longer airstrip was created in 1955 with the cooperation of the Forestry Commission, and was extended further in mid-1960s with a second aircraft hangar being constructed in late 1969.

The Cleveland Way walk traverses the extreme western end of the site where it drops away to the cliffs below. The Yorkshire Gliding Club cafe is open to non-flying personnel and walkers are welcome to sample what is on offer. Gliding courses are also available to non-members.

Incidents
The safety record at YGC (and of the wider UK gliding fraternity) is good. Across all of the gliding clubs in the United Kingdom between 1972 and 1995, they were 76 fatalities in comparison to over 8 million glider launches across the UK. All of these fatalities were glider pilots (or passengers) and no deaths occurred to people on the ground. The British Gliding Association points out that 

Due to the location of the YGC airfield over Sutton Bank and the A170 road, coupled with the crowded airspace in the Vale of York, there have been some notable incidents at Sutton Bank or in the vicinity. It is worth noting that the airspace around the airfield is designated as Class-G, which means that the principal method of preventing accidents (moreover mid-air collisions) is a "see and avoid" system. Also, microlights, gyrocopters and gliders have different airworthiness codes and different licensing standards for their pilots in comparison to those of heavier commercial, military and passenger carrying aircraft.

Notable members
Nicholas Goodhart - joined in 1938 before his wartime Royal Naval service
Amy Johnson - celebrated aviator, was a member in 1937
Fred Slingsby - founder of Slingsby Aviation
Philip Wills - competitive glider pilot

Notes

References

Sources

External links

Official History of YGC
BBC Secret Britain glider flight from Sutton Bank
1935 competition meet at Sutton Bank hosted by British Pathe

Flying clubs
Gliding in England
Gliderports in the United Kingdom
Organisations based in North Yorkshire
Sport in North Yorkshire